The ninth wave of the Walt Disney Treasures series of DVDs was released on November 3, 2009. This wave comprises two releases, each containing one season of the 1957–1959 Zorro TV series. Note that these episodes were previously released exclusively through the Disney Movie Club, but those releases were colorized whereas these releases are the original black-and-white format. Each release also includes two of the four hour-long Zorro episodes originally aired on Walt Disney Presents in 1960 and 1961. This wave is the first wave to not include any animated sets, and the last wave that has been released to date. Despite being the last wave, this was the only wave to feature standard size DVD cases, while the tin size remained the same. For the first time also, the tins were colored black, and was the second time featuring another colored tin since Oswald the Lucky Rabbit. This wave also brought back the side straps, now colored yellow instead of blue. This was also the first wave where no original animated set came out.

Zorro: The Complete First Season

This set includes all 39 episodes from the show's first season.

30,000 sets produced.

Bonus Features
The Walt Disney Presents episodes "El Bandido" and "Adios El Cuchillo" (1960)
"The Life and Legend of Zorro"
Excerpt from the Walt Disney Presents episode "The Fourth Anniversary Show"

Zorro: The Complete Second Season

This set includes all 39 episodes from the show's second season.

30,000 sets produced.

Bonus Features
The Walt Disney Presents episodes "The Postponed Wedding" and "Auld Acquaintance" (1961)
"Behind the Mask"
A Trip to the Archives

External links
 

9
Products introduced in 2009